Essex House can refer to:

Buildings
 Essex House (London), a demolished historic house in London
 JW Marriott Essex House, a luxury hotel in New York City
 a building at the University of Sussex

Other
 Essex House (publisher), a publisher of pulp fiction books, including A Feast Unknown by Philip Jose Farmer